Mats Grorud (born 1 August 1976) is a Norwegian director and animator. He is best known for his work on the films The Tower, Min Bestemor Beijing and more.

Life and career

Mats was born and raised in Tønsberg, Norway. He studied animation at the Volda University College. His animated short film Min Bestemor Beijing (My Grandmother Beijing) screened at Lübeck Nordic Film Days In 2018, his debut animated feature film The Tower premiered in the Annecy International Animated Film Festival

Filmography

Awards and nominations

References

External links 
 

1976 births
Living people
People from Tønsberg
Norwegian animated film directors
Norwegian film directors
Volda University College alumni